Sidney Franklin (1870–1931) was an American stage and film actor. He appeared in around thirty films during the silent and early sound eras. His final screen performance was in Puttin' On the Ritz in 1930. On stage he portrayed Solomon Levy in the original production of Abie's Irish Rose.

Partial filmography

 The Sleeping Lion (1919)
 Welcome Children (1921)
 The Three Musketeers (1921)
 Playing with Fire (1921)
 The Guttersnipe (1922)
 The Call of Home (1922)
 Dusk to Dawn (1922)
 The Vermilion Pencil (1922)
 The Love Trap (1923)
 Fashion Row (1923)
 A Boy of Flanders (1924)
 The Red Lily (1924)
 In Hollywood with Potash and Perlmutter (1924)
 One of the Bravest (1925)
 His People (1925)
 The Texas Trail (1925)
 Somebody's Mother (1926)
 The Block Signal (1926)
 Savage Passions (1926)
 Rose of the Tenements (1926)
 Colleen (1927)
 Wheel of Chance (1928)
 Lummox (1930)
 Puttin' On the Ritz (1930)

References

Bibliography 
 Bradley, Edwin M. The First Hollywood Musicals: A Critical Filmography Of 171 Features, 1927 Through 1932. McFarland, 2004.

External links 
 

1870 births
1931 deaths
American male film actors
American male stage actors
People from New York City